Mai Baap is a 1957 Bollywood comedy film starring Balraj Sahni, Shyama, Johnny Walker, Minoo Mumtaz in lead roles and the music in the film was composed by O. P. Nayyar.

Plot
Chandan wins a lottery ticket but Parker, ticket seller, plans to capture the winning ticket and make him fool.

Cast
 Balraj Sahni as Chandan
 Shyama as Basanti
 Johnny Walker as Parker
 Minoo Mumtaz as Leela
 Nazir Hussain as Kaka
 Raj Mehra as Banwari
 S N Banerjee as Eye Doctor
 Baby Leela as Radha

Music
Lyrics written by Jan Nisar Akhtar, Qamar Jalalabadi, Anjaan and Kapur.

References

External links

1950s Hindi-language films
Films scored by O. P. Nayyar
1957 films
Indian comedy-drama films
Films directed by M. Sadiq